PersonalJava was a Java edition for mobile and embedded systems based on Java 1.1.8. It has been superseded by the CDC's Personal Profile, which is not widely deployed.

References

External links
PersonalJava Application Environment

Java device platform